The following lists events that happened during 1978 in Cape Verde.

Incumbents
President: Aristides Pereira
Prime Minister: Pedro Pires

Events
Trade union UNTC-CS established

Sports
Final of the Cape Verdean Football Championship was not played

Births
February 4: Elvis Évora, basketball player
March 17: Mário Correia, basketball player
April 7: Hernani Almeida, musician
June 9: Nando Maria Neves, footballer
December 7: Ronny Souto, footballer

References

 
Years of the 20th century in Cape Verde
1970s in Cape Verde
Cape Verde
Cape Verde